Iturup Airport  is a public airport on Iturup Island, Russia.

History 
The airport has been in commercial operation since 22 September 2014. It has been built in a swampy taiga and it is the first airport built from scratch in Russia's post-Soviet history. In 2018, Iturup, became a joint civil-military airport with the stationing there of a flight of Su-35S fighters from the 23rd  Fighter Aviation Regiment, designated Yasny air base.

Before Iturup Airport was built, Burevestnik Military Air Base, located 40 km southwest from the town center (or 60 km by road), had been the only airport serving Kurilsk. Now, it becomes a reserve airfield for Iturup. Because it is often closed due to fog, new Iturup Airport improves air traffic punctuality.

Facilities 

Airlines and destinations

References

Airports in Sakhalin Oblast
Iturup
Airports established in 2014
2014 establishments in Russia